Zachary Mason (born 1974) is a computer scientist and novelist. He wrote the New York Times bestselling The Lost Books of the Odyssey (2007; revised edition 2010), a variation on Homer, and Void Star (2017), a science fiction novel about artificial intelligence. In 2018, he published Metamorphica, based on Ovid's Metamorphoses.

Mason grew up in Silicon Valley, attended Bard College at Simon's Rock, and received a doctorate from Brandeis University, publishing his thesis A computational, corpus-based metaphor extraction system in 2002. He works for a Silicon Valley startup.

References

External links
 "The Machine Edda," by Zachary Mason in Guernica - April 26, 2008
 A.I., the Simulated Annealing Search, and The Lost Books of the Odyssey: An Interview with Zachary Mason - Washington City Paper, Mar. 4, 2010
The Truth About AI: A Secular Ghost Story by Zachary Mason in The Paris Review - Dec. 20, 2018

Brandeis University alumni
1974 births
Living people
Bard College alumni
Writers from California
American male novelists
21st-century American novelists
21st-century American male writers
American computer scientists